Ana María Cano González (Villarín, Somiedo, Asturias, 12 May 1950) is a Spanish philologist. She was dean of the faculty of Philology of the University of Oviedo and chair of romance philology. She received her master's degree in primary education in 1967, after exerting this profession, a  license in philosophy and letters from the University of Oviedo in 1972, and  a doctorate at the same institution in 1975, cum laude, with a thesis on "The speech of Somiedo". Since 2001, she has been president of the Academy of the Asturian Language.

Selected works
 El habla de Somiedo (1975)
 Vocabulario del bable de Somiedo (1982)
 Averamientu a la hestoria de la llingua asturiana (1987)
 Notas de Folklor Somedán (1989)
 Estudios de diacronía asturiana (2008)
 El habla de Somiedo (occidente de Asturias) (2009)

References

1950 births
Living people
Spanish philologists
Women philologists
People from Asturias
University of Oviedo alumni
Academic staff of the University of Oviedo